The Diocese of Portsmouth is an administrative division of the Church of England Province of Canterbury in England. The diocese covers south-east Hampshire and the Isle of Wight. The see is based in the City of Portsmouth in Hampshire, where the seat is located at the Cathedral Church of St Thomas of Canterbury.

Origin
The Diocese of Portsmouth was created on 1 May 1927 under George V from the Diocese of Winchester. It consists of the three archdeaconries of:
Portsdown (comprising the deaneries of Portsmouth and Havant);
The Meon (comprising the deaneries of Fareham, Gosport, Petersfield and Bishop's Waltham);
The Isle of Wight (comprising the deanery of the Isle of Wight).

Bishops
The Bishop of Portsmouth leads the diocese as one of two diocesan bishops in the Church of England not assisted by a suffragan bishop, the other being the Bishop of Hereford.

Alternative episcopal oversight (for parishes in the diocese which do not accept the ordination of women as priests) is provided by the provincial episcopal visitor, Norman Banks, Bishop suffragan of Richborough. There are also four former bishops living in the diocese who are licensed as honorary assistant bishops:
1995–present: A retired Bishop of Guildford, Michael Adie, lives in Froxfield, Hampshire and is also licensed in the Diocese of Chichester.

2008–present: Godfrey Ashby was a diocesan bishop then a theology professor (and assistant bishop) in South Africa before returning to Britain as the full-time Assistant Bishop of Leicester. He retired back to South Africa, where he was an assistant bishop, then returned to live in Broadclyst, Devon (where he is also licensed in the Diocese of Exeter.)

2012–present: Timothy Bavin, oblate master at Alton Abbey, is a retired Bishop of Portsmouth who is licensed as an honorary assistant bishop in both Winchester (in which diocese the abbey lies) and Portsmouth dioceses.

2012–present: John Hind, retired Bishop of Chichester, lives in Emsworth.

Safeguarding
The Anglican Diocese of Portsmouth had a number of sexual abuse convictions in the 1980s and 1990s. Timothy Bavin was the Bishop between 1985 and 1995 and during this time a number of serious safeguarding issues took place. For example, Bavin did not report Fr Terry Knight to the police when parents raised their concerns to him in 1985. Knight was allowed to carry on in his position until he was later convicted for sexually abusing boys in 1996 and again in 2016. Bavin had also allowed a convicted paedophile called Fr Michael Gover to carry on working for the church on his release in 1990. Gover was convicted in 1985 at around the same time as parents raising their concerns about Knight. Bavin stood down in 1995 whilst Knight's police investigation and court case was taking place.

Archdeaconries and deaneries 

*including Cathedral

List of churches

Not in a deanery

Deanery of Havant

Deanery of Portsmouth

Deanery of the Isle of Wight

Deanery of Bishop's Waltham

Deanery of Fareham

Deanery of Gosport

Deanery of Petersfield

See also
Catholic diocese of Portsmouth
Church of England Statistics 2002

References

External links
Diocesan website
Portsmouth Cathedral
Portsmouth Readers' Board

 
Christianity in Hampshire
Christianity on the Isle of Wight
Christian organizations established in 1927
Portsmouth